The following is a list of ghosts:

African folklore

 Adze, Ewe vampiric being
 Amadlozi, Nguni spiritual figures
 Asanbosam, Akan vampire
 Egbere, Yoruban malevolent spirit
 Kishi, Angolan two-faced demon
 Madam Koi Koi, Nigerian ghost
 Mbwiri, Central African demon

 Obambo, Central African supernatural being
 Obayifo, Ashanti vampire
 Obia, West African monster
 Ogbanje, Igbo evil spirit
 Tikoloshe, spirit from Zulu cultures
 Zar, Ethiopian demon

Asian folklore

East Asia 
China

 Hungry ghost
 Mogwai
 Vengeful ghost
 Wangliang
 Yaoguai
Korea

 Korean virgin ghost
 Egg ghost

Japan

 Ayakashi
 Chōchin-obake
 Funayūrei
 Gashadokuro
 Goryō
 Hitodama
 Ikiryō
 Inugami
 Kuchisake-onna
 Mononoke
 Mujina
 Noppera-bō
 Nure-onna
 Obake
 Ochimusha
 Onryō
 Raijū
 Rokurokubi
 Shikigami
 Shinigami
 Shirime
 Shiryō
 Tsukumogami
 Ubume
 Umibōzu
 Yōkai
 Yōsei
 Yuki-onna
 Yūrei
 Zashiki-warashi

South Asia 
India

 Bhakolwa
 Daayan
 Chetkin
 Churel
 Challava
 Manjulika
 Naagin
 Nale Ba
 Pishacha
 Preta
 Pūtam
 Vetala
 Yakshini

Sri Lanka

 Asura
 Bodilima
 Devil Bird
 Gara yaka
 Holnab
 Kalu Kumara
 Kola Sanni Yaka
 Kumbanda
 Maha Sohona
 Mala preta
 Mara
 Pisacha
 Preta
 Riri yaka
 Suniyam yaka
 Yaksha

Nepal
 Banjhakri and Banjhakrini
 Kichkandi
 Raakebhoot

Pakistan
 Churel
 Pichal Peri

Bangladesh

 Bhrommo Doitto
 Bhoot
 Dayniburi
 Daynii
 Doitoo
 Geccho Bhoot
 Kana Bhola
 Khuqqush
 Jukkho
 Meccho Bhoot
 Mamdo Bhoot
 Nishi
 Petni
 Pishach
 Shakchunni

Southeast Asia 

Indonesia/Malaysia

 Babi Ngepet
 Hantu Air
 Hantu Bongkok
 Hantu Raya
 Hantu Tinggi
 Jenglot
 Kuntilanak, also called Matianak or Pontianak (folklore)
 Langsuyar
 Leyak
 Orang Bunian
 Orang Minyak
 Pelesit
 Penanggalan
 Pocong
 Sundel bolong
 Toyol
 Wewe Gombel

Myanmar
 Nat
 Peik-ta
 Thayé
Philippines
 Aswang
 Kapre
 Manananggal
 Tiyanak
Thailand
 Krasue
 Krahang
 Mae Nak 
 Nang Takian
 Nang Tani
 Phi Pop

Middle East folklore 

Egyptian and Arabic

 Hatif
 Ifrit

Persian

 Div
 Marid

Turkish

 Basty
 Gelin
 Hortdan
 Kormos

Jewish mythology
 Dybbuk
 Mazzikin

European folklore 

 The Headless Horseman
 The Wild Hunt
 White Lady
Finland
 Grey Lady, believed to haunt the Mustio Manor in Karis, Raseborg
Graeco-Roman

 Genius loci
 Shade

 Vrykolakas

Malta
 Black Knight, believed to haunt Fort Manoel
 Blue Lady, believed to haunt Verdala Palace
 Grey Lady, believed to haunt Fort St Angelo
Katarina, believed to haunt Mdina
Romania
 Iele, feminine mythical creatures
 Moroi, a type of vampire or ghost
 Muma Pădurii, an ugly and mean old woman living in the forest
 Pricolici, similar to Strigoi, but for worse souls
 Samca, an evil spirit, said to curse children and pregnant women with illness
 Spiriduş, a domestic spirit/familiar that when summoned, acts as an intermediate between the devil and the master of the home
 Stafie, spirits of the dead who are bound to a place in which they lived in life; a poltergeist
 Strigoi, troubled souls of the dead rising from the grave
 Vâlvă, feminine nature spirits that control various phenomena. Can be good or bad 
 Vântoase, female spirits of the wind
 Zmeu, a fantastic creature
Scandinavia
 Knights of Ålleberg, are the ghosts of twelve knights that died in the Battle of Ålleberg in 1389

 Landvættir

 Myling, a child ghost

Slavic folklore
 Baba Yaga
 Countess Báthory allegedly haunts her former castle at Čachtice
 Dhampir
 Dvorovoi
 Dziwożona
 Kikimora
 Sava Savanović
Spain
 The ghost of Catalina Lercaro in the Museum of the History of Tenerife
 Santa Compaña

United Kingdom
 Agnes Sampson, known as Bloody Agnes, believed to haunt Holyrood Palace
 Bloody Mary
 The Brown Lady
 Cock Lane ghost (called "Scratching Fanny") received massive public attention in 18th-century England
 Drummer of Tedworth
 Dullahan, similar to the headless horseman
 The ghost nun of Borley Rectory
 The ghost of Anne Boleyn, reportedly seen at the Tower of London
 Grey Lady, a ghost believed to haunt Glamis Castle
 Man in Grey of the Theatre Royal
 Nan Tuck's Ghost, believed to haunt Nan Tuck's Lane, one mile from Buxted
 Sweet William's Ghost

North American 

Canada
 Aeneas Shaw's daughter, Sophia allegedly haunts Queenston, Ontario
 Alexander Keith allegedly haunts his brewery in Halifax, Nova Scotia
 Charles Melville Hays allegedly haunts Château Laurier in Ottawa, Ontario
 The Dungarvon Whooper is a ghost believed to haunt Blackville, New Brunswick
 Emily Carr allegedly haunts James Bay Inn in Victoria, British Columbia
 Francis Nicholson Darke allegedly haunts Darke Hall in Regina, Saskatchewan
 The Headless Nun is a purported ghost believed to haunt French Fort Cove in Nordin, New Brunswick
 Lady in Red
 Minnie Hopkins, wife of Edward Nicholas Hopkins, allegedly haunts Hopkins Dining Parlour in Moose Jaw, Saskatchewan
 Nils von Schoultz allegedly haunts Fort Henry in Kingston, Ontario
 White Lady
Caribbean
 Douen
 Duppy
 Hupia
Jumbee
Lwa
Phantome
Soucouyant
United States
 The Bell Witch was a poltergeist said to haunt the family of John Bell near the town of Adams, Tennessee in 1817. The spirit was said to have manifested itself as various animals and a disembodied voice and cited Bible scripture. The Bell Witch partly inspired The Blair Witch Project and the events of her story were depicted in the film An American Haunting
 Emily, the ghost of a young girl who supposedly haunts a covered bridge in Stowe, Vermont. The bridge is dubbed "Emily's Bridge" and she is said to be seen only at midnight
 Joe Bush, a legendary ghost that allegedly haunts the Sumpter Valley Gold Dredge in Sumpter, Oregon. He is said to leave wet, bare footprints on the decks of the dredge, cause lights to flicker, and doors to open and close
 The ghost of Resurrection Mary allegedly haunts roads and buildings around Resurrection Cemetery near Justice, Illinois, a suburb of Chicago.
 Ghost of Queen Esther, the ghost of an Iroquois woman who allegedly mourns the massacre of her village in Pennsylvania.
 Ghosts of the American Civil War
 Greenbrier Ghost, the alleged ghost of a young woman in Greenbrier County, West Virginia. In a court trial, the woman's mother claimed that her daughter's ghost told her she had been murdered.
 Kate Morgan, a ghost which is said to haunt the Hotel del Coronado in Coronado, California
 Lady in Red
 Minnie Quay, a legendary ghost of Michigan
 Old Book is the name given to a ghost or spirit which allegedly haunts a cemetery at Peoria State Hospital in Bartonville, Illinois
 Pedro Benedit Horruytiner, colonial governor of Florida. Alleged encounters with his ghost have been reported there
 President Abraham Lincoln's ghost has been reported in the White House numerous times, many of those by prominent people such as President Theodore Roosevelt, First Lady Grace Coolidge, Queen Wilhelmina of the Netherlands, and Winston Churchill
 The Red Lady of Huntingdon College is a ghost believed to haunt the former Pratt Hall dormitory at Huntingdon College in Montgomery, Alabama
 The Ridgeway Ghost of Wisconsin Folklore, is believed to terrorize people along a 25-mile stretch of old mining road
 Slag Pile Annie, a ghost said to appear as an elderly woman working in a remote and hard-to-access location in the former Jones and Laughlin Steel Corporation mill in Pittsburgh, Pennsylvania
 The Wizard Clip was a ghost said to have clipped articles of clothing and visitor's hair at a home in Middleway, WV after a Catholic traveler died there in 1794 without receiving any Last rites
 White Lady
Other urban legends
 The Bell Witch
 Vanishing hitchhiker
Mexico

South American folklore 
 La Llorona, a ghost of Latin American folklore who is said to have murdered her children
 Sayona, a Venezuelan vengeful spirit who appears to unfaithful husbands
 Sihuanaba, a shapeshifting spirit of Central America who lures men into danger before revealing her face to be that of a horse or a skull
 The Silbón, a legendary figure in Colombia and Venezuela, described as a lost soul

Oceania 
Australia
 Frederick Baker ("Frederick Federici") of Princess Theatre, Melbourne
 Monte Cristo Homestead of Junee, New South Wales; allegedly Australia's most haunted house

List of reportedly haunted locations 

 Canada
 Colombia
 France
 Mexico
 Philippines
 Romania
 Scotland

 South Africa
 United Kingdom
 United States
 San Francisco
 Washington DC

Ghosts by culture

Asia 

 Chinese
 Korea
 Japan
 Vietnam
 Thai
 Malay
 Filipino
 India
 Bengali
 Sri Lanka

Others 

 English speaking cultures
 Mesopotamian
 Mexico
 Polynesian
 Maori
 Spanish speaking cultures

Popular culture

Television and film 
 Adam, and Barbara Maitland from the 1988 film Beetlejuice
 Agatha Prenderghast, a character from the stop-motion animated film, ParaNorman
 Annie Sawyer and Alex Millar from the television series Being Human, and Matt Bolton from the spin-off Becoming Human
 Archibald Corduroy, Ma and Pa Duskerton and the unnamed lumberjack from Gravity Falls
 Billy Joe Cobra, a ghost from the French/British animated television series, Dude, That's My Ghost!
 Carrie Krueger, an emo ghost from Cartoon Network's The Amazing World of Gumball
 Casper the Friendly Ghost and his uncles, the Ghostly Trio also known as of Fatso, Stinky, and Stretch
 Danny Phantom
 The Dead Men of Dunharrow in J.R.R. Tolkien's The Lord of the Rings. Also the Nazgûl in the same work; nine former men resurrected as wraiths to do Sauron's bidding
 The Flying Dutchman, a pirate ghost from SpongeBob SquarePants
 Ghosts (2019 TV Series) includes the Captain, Mary, Robin, Kitty, Thomas Thorne, Julian Fawcett, Lady Fanny Button, Pat Butcher and Humphrey
 The Grudge: Kayako Saeki, the onryo, and her homicidal husband Takeo Saeki, the evil yurei 
 Harry Potter series:
 The Bloody Baron
 The Fat Friar
 The Grey Lady
 Moaning Myrtle
 Peeves the Poltergeist
 Professor Cuthbert Binns
 Sir Nicholas de Mimsy-Porpington, aka Nearly Headless Nick
 Sir Patrick Delaney-Podmore
 Ghost Princess from Cartoon Network's Adventure Time
 High-Five Ghost, a friend of Muscle Man from Cartoon Network's Regular Show
 Lonesome Ghosts from the Mickey Mouse series
 Marty Hopkirk, in the BBC series Randall and Hopkirk (deceased) also known as My Partner the Ghost in the USA
 Penny Halliwell, Patricia "Patty" Halliwell from Charmed
 Phantasma Phantom, a laughter prone musically talented ghost girl from the 1988 movie Scooby-Doo and the Ghoul School
 Reverend Henry Kane and the other ghosts from the Poltergeist film series
 Omiyo, or Ghost-chan, a ghost that haunts the Hinata family's basement in the anime Keroro Gunso

Ruby Gloom (Canadian TV series) ghosts:
 Booboo, a young ghost and a regular inhabitant of the house, enjoys spooking but generally is not able to scare the other members of the household
 "The Whites", two mature and rather heavyset male ghosts, call each other by the name "Mr. White". They have some rank in the ghostly realm and are Booboo's superiors. Both wear sunglasses but one wears a tie
 Sam Wheat, a character from the 1990 film Ghost
 Slimer from Ghostbusters and its sequel
 Spectra Vondergeist, daughter of the ghosts from Monster High
 Tenkuuji Takeru, protagonist of Kamen Rider Ghost. The ghosts of fifteen significant historical figures also appear in the series

Comics 
 The Gay Ghost, later renamed the Grim Ghost, is a DC Comics superhero
 Gentleman Ghost is a DC Comics supervillain
 Ghost, the superhero from Dark Horse Comics
 Homer the Happy Ghost, a fictional character published by Atlas Comics in the 1950s
 Reimi Sugimoto, her dog Arnold and, later, Jean Pierre Polnareff from JoJo's Bizarre Adventure
 Spooky the Tuff Little Ghost, a comic book and animation ghost related to Casper
 Timmy the Timid Ghost, a comic book ghost

Literature 
 Banquo from William Shakespeare's 1606 play Macbeth
 The Canterville Ghost of Oscar Wilde's popular 1887 short story of the same name
 Captain Daniel Gregg, a sea captain from the 1945 novel, The Ghost of Captain Gregg and Mrs. Muir, later adapted into a 1947 film and 1968–1970 television series
 Charles Dickens 1843 novel A Christmas Carol which includes Jacob Marley, The Ghost of Christmas Past, Ghost of Christmas Present, and the Ghost of Christmas Yet to Come
 Emily, a ghost from the single volume graphic novel Anya's Ghost by Vera Brosgol
 The Flying Dutchman, originally from A Voyage to Botany Bay (1795) by George Barrington
 Hamlet's father from William Shakespeare's play Hamlet
 Hugh Crain from the 1959 novel The Haunting of Hill House, its 1963 film adaption and the 1999 remake
 The Little Ghost Godfrey a Swedish children's book character
 Marion and George Kerby, ghosts who haunt Cosmo Topper in the two novels by Thorne Smith, the film Topper and its sequels Topper Takes a Trip and Topper Returns, and the television series Topper
 Nicky, Tara, Mr and Mrs Roland and Phears from the Mostly Ghostly book series by R.L. Stine

Video games 
Boo (formerly Boo Diddley) and King Boo, an enemy in the Mario series of games.
 LeChuck of the series of graphic adventure games Monkey Island
 Pac-Man's ghosts Blinky (red), Pinky (pink), Inky (blue) and Clyde (orange) and Sue
 Mettaton and Napstablook from 2015 video game Undertale. The former is a ghost inside a robot body and the latter is Mettaton's cousin, a musician/DJ who makes "spooky remixes".

See also
 Fear of ghosts
 Ghost films
 Ghost hunting
 Ghost ships
 Ghost stories
 Ghost trains
 Haunted houses
 Poltergeist

References

External links
 

 
Ghosts